Pelmatozoa was once a clade of Phylum Echinodermata. It included stalked and sedentary echinoderms. The main class of Pelmatozoa were the Crinoidea which includes sea lily and feather star.

Pelmetazoa is no longer a classification of Echinodermata.

References

Echinoderm taxonomy
Obsolete animal taxa